Patricia Mirallès (born 22 August 1967) is a French politician of the Territories of Progress (TdP) party who has been serving as Secretary of State to the Minister of the Armed Forces in the government of Prime Minister Élisabeth Borne since 2022. From the 2017 elections to 2022, she was a member of the French National Assembly, representing the department of Hérault.

Early life and education
Mirallès was born to Pieds-Noirs parents and grew up in Montpellier.

Political career
Mirallès was a member of the Socialist Party from 1997 until 2012. From 2017 until 2020, she was a member of La République En Marche! (LREM).

In parliament, Mirallès served on the Defence Committee.

References

1967 births
Living people
Deputies of the 15th National Assembly of the French Fifth Republic
Women members of the National Assembly (France)
La République En Marche! politicians
Socialist Party (France) politicians
21st-century French women politicians
Members of the Borne government
Deputies of the 16th National Assembly of the French Fifth Republic
Politicians from Montpellier